Rick DeMarinis (May 3, 1934 - June 12, 2019) was an American novelist and short story writer.

Life
DeMarinis was born in New York City to "Big Al" DeMarinis, an Italian gangster, and Ruth Siik, a Finnish dancer. After their divorce, he was sent briefly to a Catholic boarding school before his mother took him to live with her relatives in Michigan. He led an itinerant childhood with his mother, living in Michigan, Texas, New York, and California twice while his mother pursued work opportunities. After high school he joined the Air Force in hopes of seeing the world, but was instead stationed in Havre, Montana.

In Havre he met his first wife, Mary Lee, with whom he had two children. After his time in the Air Force, he went to work in the aviation industry at both Lockheed and Boeing, experiences which influenced his novel Scimitar. He then returned to school, attending the University of Montana to study literature. There he met his second wife, Carol, in a poetry class, whom he would later have another child with.

He taught at the University of Montana, San Diego State University, Arizona State University, and the University of Texas at El Paso. While at Montana he lived across the street from Richard Hugo, who he considered his mentor, and down the block from James Welch, a frequent writing partner. It was during this time he published his first novel, A Lovely Monster.

His short stories have appeared in Esquire, The Atlantic Monthly, Harpers, GQ, The Paris Review, and The Iowa Review.

DeMarinis died on June 12, 2019, due to complications from Lewy body dementia.

Awards
 Two National Endowment for the Arts fellowships
 1986 Drue Heinz Literature Prize for short fiction
 1990 Literature Award from the American Academy and Institute of Arts and Letters
 1999 Jesse H. Jones Award for fiction from the Texas Institute of Letters
 2000 Independent Publishers Award for the best book of short fiction

Works

Novels

 (1st edition 1989)

Short fiction

Non-Fiction

Anthologies

References

1934 births
2019 deaths
American male writers
University of Texas at El Paso faculty
San Diego State University faculty
Arizona State University faculty
University of Montana faculty